Barringtonia lanceolata grows as a tree up to  tall, with a trunk diameter of up to . The bark is brown, grey or reddish brown and has been used as fish poison. Habitat is forest from sea level to  altitude. B. lanceolata is endemic to Borneo.

References

lanceolata
Endemic flora of Borneo
Trees of Borneo
Plants described in 1938